Dave's Old Porn was a comedy show starring Dave Attell that premiered on Showtime on October 20, 2011. Attell has described the series as "the Mystery Science Theater of porn." Through the show's Twitter account, Attell said Showtime passed on a third season, and that he intended to continue the show in a smaller form through the website.

Plot
Attell and his co-hosts review pornographic films from the  genre's golden age of the 1970s and 1980s. Attell is joined by a fellow comedian to make jokes about a variety of porn clips. Typically, the pair view clips from movies of one particular porn star. Then, near the end of the episode, they are joined by the porn star whose movies they've been viewing over the course of the episode.

All sexual acts such as fellatio, cunnilingus, genitalia and ejaculations are censored, with either an image of a VHS cassette, cartoons, food, a strategically placed image of Attell's face, or the sofa the hosts are using.

Episodes and guests

Season 1

Season 2

References

External links
 
 

2010s American comedy television series
2011 American television series debuts
2012 American television series endings
Pornographic television shows
Showtime (TV network) original programming